was a Japanese ice hockey player. He competed in the men's tournament at the 1936 Winter Olympics.

References

External links
 

1909 births
Year of death missing
Japanese ice hockey players
Olympic ice hockey players of Japan
Ice hockey players at the 1936 Winter Olympics
Place of birth missing